Baeonoma favillata is a moth of the family Depressariidae. It is found in Peru.

The wingspan is about 16 mm. The forewings are grey-whitish with the costa narrowly grey from the base to four-fifths, darker towards the base. There is a spot of grey suffusion below the middle of the disc, one on the upper angle of the cell, and two small ones towards the lower angle, as well as a rather broad subterminal fascia of grey suffusion, interrupted on the veins. There are some cloudy dark fuscous marginal dots around the apex and termen. The hindwings are grey.

References

Moths described in 1915
Baeonoma
Moths of South America
Taxa named by Edward Meyrick